FC Shakhtar Makiivka was a Ukrainian football club from Makiivka, Donetsk Oblast.

History
The club was established in 1981 as Bazhanovets Makiivka representing the Bazhanov coal mine of the State mining enterprise Makiyivvuhol (Makeyevugol). From 1992 until 1999 participated in the professional competitions of Ukraine.

In 1995 it was renamed as Shakhtar Makiivka after another club with same name, but which represented another mine "Kholodna Balka" also belonging to Makiyivvuhol. Also the Makiivka Metallurgical Plant had its own football club Kirovets Makiivka which during the Soviet period competed at professional level.

Honours
 Ukrainian Second League
 Winners (1): 1992 (shared; Transition League)

 Donetsk Oblast Football Championship
Winners (3): 1982, 1985, 1986

League and cup history

{|class="wikitable"
|-bgcolor="#efefef"
! Season
! Div.
! Pos.
! Pl.
! W
! D
! L
! GS
! GA
! P
!Domestic Cup
!colspan=2|Europe
!Notes
|-
| 1992
| 3rd
| 1st
| 16
| 10
| 3
| 3
| 25
| 8
| 23
| –
| –
| –
| Bazhanovets
|}

See also
 Bazhanov coal mine
 FC Makiyivvuhillya Makiyivka

 
Defunct football clubs in Ukraine
Football clubs in Makiivka
Mining association football teams in Ukraine
Association football clubs established in 1981
Association football clubs disestablished in 1999
1981 establishments in Ukraine
1999 disestablishments in Ukraine